Wikstroemia fruticosa is a shrub in the family Thymelaeaceae.  It is found in Brazil.

Description
The shrub grows to a height of up to 4 m.  Its leaves are light green with serrated edges.  Its flowers are white.

References

fruticosa